Field hockey events were contested at the 1990 Asian Games in Olympic Sports Centre, Beijing, China.

Medalists

Medal table

Results

Men

Women

References
Results Men
Results Women

 
1990 Asian Games events
1990
Asian Games
1990 Asian Games